The One Percent is a 2006 documentary about the growing wealth gap between the wealthy elite compared to the  overall citizenry in the United States. It was created by Jamie Johnson, an heir to the Johnson & Johnson fortune, and produced by Jamie Johnson and Nick Kurzon. The film's title refers to the top one percent of Americans in terms of wealth, who controlled 42.2 percent of total financial wealth in 2004.

The film premiered on April 29, 2006, at the Tribeca Film Festival. A revised version of the film incorporating footage shot since the 2006 festival screening premiered on February 21, 2008, on HBO's Cinemax.

Interviews 
The film is 76 minutes long and features interviews with a diverse range of individuals:
 Nicole Buffett – Adopted daughter of Warren Buffett's son Peter from a previous marriage. Warren disowned her shortly after she appeared on Oprah with Johnson to discuss the film in 2006. The disownment received attention in the media and was discussed in the documentary when it aired on HBO's Cinemax in 2008.
 Chuck Collins – Estate tax proponent, author, and great-grandson of Oscar Mayer
 Steve Forbes – CEO of Forbes, Inc., former presidential candidate, proponent of a flat tax, and son of Malcolm Forbes
 Cody Franchetti – Italian baron, and heir to Milliken & Company
 Milton Friedman – Economist, and Nobel Laureate: 1976 winner of the Nobel Memorial Prize in Economic Sciences. Friedman abruptly ends the interview after accusing Johnson of advocating socialism. 
 Bill Gates Sr. – Father of Microsoft Founder Bill Gates, and opponent of an estate tax repeal
 Michael Hakim – real estate heir and Beverly Hills City Council candidate 
 James Hughes Jr. – Family wealth advisor
 Eddie Bernice Johnson – Former Chair of the Congressional Black Caucus
 Gretchen Johnson – Jamie Johnson's mother
 James Johnson – Jamie Johnson's father
 Adnan Khashoggi – International arms merchant
 Claude R. Kirk Jr. – Former governor of Florida
 Greg Kushner – Lido Wealth Conference Director
 John Lewis – U.S. Representative from Georgia
 Roy O. Martin – President of the Louisiana-based Martin Lumber Company
 Brian McNally – The Johnson family's financial advisor (asset manager)
 Dan Miller – Former U.S. Representative from Florida
 Karl Muth – Investment banking heir
 Ralph Nader – Consumer advocate and former presidential candidate
 Larry Noble – OpenSecrets
 Paul Orfalea – Founder of Kinko's
 Kevin Phillips – Former Republican Party strategist
 Jimmie Price – Taxi driver
 Nathaniel P. Reed – Undersecretary of The Interior, from 1967-1973
 Robert Reich – Former U.S. Secretary of Labor
 Greg Schell – Attorney, Migrant Farmer Justice Program
 Edward Wolff – Professor of Economics, New York University

See also 
 Occupy Wall Street
 We are the 99%

References

External links
 Official website
 

2006 films
American documentary films
Documentary films about the ruling class
Documentary films about families
2006 documentary films
Films directed by Jamie Johnson (filmmaker)
HBO documentary films
2000s English-language films
2000s American films